Maramureș or Marmaroshchyna is a geographical, historical and cultural region in northern Romania and western Ukraine. It is situated in the northeastern Carpathians, along parts of the upper Tisza River drainage basin; it covers the Maramureș Depression and the surrounding Carpathian mountains.

Alternatively, the term Maramureș is also used for the Maramureș County of Romania, which contains the southern section of the historical region.

Name in other languages 

Geography
Maramureș is a valley enclosed by the Oaș, Gutâi, Țibleș and Rodnei mountains (the northern section of the Inner Eastern Carpathians) to the west and south, the Maramureș Mountains and the central section of the Outer Eastern Carpathians to the east and north. The valley is drained through a narrow opening, the Khust Gate, at Khust. Several dozen small mountain rivers and creeks flow into the river Tisa. It is forested and not easily accessible.

The limits of the region are between the parallels of 47°33' N and 47°02' N and the meridians of 23°15' E and 25°03' E. Maramureș represents one of the largest depressions in the Carpathians, covering an area of about 10,000 km².

Its length from Khust to Prislop Pass is about 150 km and width from North to South is up to 80 km.

The main mountain passes linking Maramureș with the neighboring regions are high and in the past were hardly accessible in the winter. The Prislop Pass (1,416 m high) links the east of the region with Moldavia, Dealul Ștefăniței (1,254 m) links the south to Transylvania, the Pintea Pass (987 m) towards Baia Mare, Fărgău (587 m) in the west links the region to Oaș Country, while Frasini Pass (Yasinia; 931 m) links the north of the region to Galicia.

The mountains surrounding this region occupy more than half of the area. A few peaks reach above 2,000 m, such as Pietrosul (2,303 m) in the Rodnei Mountains to the south and Hovârla (2,061 m) in Muntele Negru (Cernahora) to the north.

The heavy forested mountains sustain many protected species of plants, such as yew (Taxus baccata), larch (Larix decidua), Swiss pine (Pinus cembra), edelweiss (Leontopodium alpinum); and animals, such as lynx (Lynx lynx), chamois (Rupicapra rupicapra), alpine marmot (Marmota marmota), golden eagle (Aquila chrysaetos), and capercaillie (Tetrao urogallus).

The last wisent from present-day Romania territory, a symbol of Maramureș, was hunted to extinction in 1852. Lostriţa, a local variety of salmon, still live in the mountain rivers.

Several protected areas have been created in Maramureș. The Rodna Mountains National Park was designated in 1990, the Maramureș Mountains Natural Park in 2004, and there are many other caves, gorges, cliff formations, and lakes which are officially-protected areas.

History

In ancient times, this area was settled by Celts, Dacians, Sarmatians, Germanic peoples and Akatziri. In the first century BC, it was part of the Dacian Kingdom under Burebista, while in the early Middle Ages, it was ruled by the Hunnic Empire, the Kingdom of the Gepids, the Kingdom of the Avars, the White Croatia, Hungarians and even the Kievan Rus'.

The territory was part of the Kingdom of Hungary from the 11th century and was nominally divided between the Gyepű border region, comitatus of Szatmár and comitatus of Borsova. Later, the whole region was included in the comitatus of Máramaros. Initially, the Romanian inhabitants of the region were allowed to preserve their political organization, the Voivodeship of Maramureș, divided into many small autonomous areas. The King long struggled to convince the Voivodes to accept the title of Count, with the implied loss of independence in political and financial matters. During the Middle Ages, the people in many mountain villages, where each family by definition had a considerable domain, were called nameşi, meaning free peasants taking pride in their family. The origin of the word is disputed: in the Kingdom of Hungary, free people possessing land were called  in Hungarian. The region was reorganized to Máramaros County in the 14th century.

In the 16th century, the Kingdom of Hungary was invaded and all but destroyed by the Ottoman Empire, and the area came under administration of the semi-independent Ottoman Principality of Transylvania. Later (in the late 17th century) it came under the administration of the Habsburg monarchy (which became the Austrian Empire in 1804). During Habsburg administration, the region was initially part of the  lands of the Habsburg Principality of Transylvania, but was later (in 1732) transferred to the Habsburg Kingdom of Hungary. In 1867, the Austrian Empire was transformed into the dual monarchy of Austria-Hungary and the region was included in the Transleithanian or Hungarian part of the Monarchy.

After the First World War, the region was divided between Romania and the Czechoslovakian region of Carpathian Ruthenia, with the border following that of the short-lived Hutsul Republic. In March 1939 Hungary annexed Carpathian Ruthenia and in August 1940 annexed the region of Northern Transylvania, which included southern Maramureș, from Romania; the territories remained under Hungarian control until 1944. After World War II, the southern section returned to Romania and is now part of Maramureș County; the northern section was incorporated into the Soviet Union as part of the Ukrainian SSR and is now part of Zakarpattia Oblast of independent Ukraine.

People
In the southern area, the majority of the population are Romanians. There are also some Hungarians, Rusyns, Ukrainians, Zipser Germans, Jews, and Roma. In the northern area, the majority are Ukrainians, with smaller Romanian, Hungarian and German communities.

In the northern area most people speak Hutsul dialect of Ukrainian language, while in the southern area most speak Romanian, which is why the region was split into two parts. Since the 1940s there have been villages cut in two by the state border. There are some villages in the north (within Ukraine) that have a sizeable Romanian population, as well as some villages in Romania that have a sizeable Ukrainian population.

Gallery

See also 
 Wooden churches of Maramureș
 Northern Maramureș
 Hutsul Republic

Further reading 
Atlas and Gazetteer of Historic Hungary 1914, Talma Kiadó 
 Sighetul Marmatiei, Culture and Tourism 2007, Teofil Ivanciuc

References

External links 

 Things to do when visiting Maramureș
 English translation of the Máramaros Yizkor Book Sefer Marmarosh; mea ve-shishim kehilot kedoshot be-yishuvan u-ve-hurbanan published in 1983 and 1996 (history and remembrance book of the approximately 160 Máramaros area Jewish shtetls and communities, and their destruction in the Holocaust)

 
Divided regions
Historical regions in Romania
Historical regions in Ukraine